Ochrosia haleakalae, the island yellowwood or hōlei, is a species of plant in the family Apocynaceae that is endemic to Hawaii.  It is threatened by habitat loss.

References

Endemic flora of Hawaii
Trees of Hawaii
haleakalae
Endangered plants
Taxonomy articles created by Polbot